Limburg-Styrum-Iller-Aichheim was a County of medieval Germany, based in the Lordship of Iller-Aichheim. It was partitioned from Limburg-Styrum-Gemen in 1657. When the line of Limburg-Styrum-Gemen became extinct in 1782 the Counts of Limburg-Styrum-Iller-Aichheim inherited it and the Imperial Estate of Gemen. However, when in 1800 this line became extinct, it was inherited by Boyneburg-Bömelberg instead of Limburg-Styrum-Styrum.

Counts of Limburg-Styrum-Iller-Aichheim (1657–1800)

House of Limburg
Counties of the Holy Roman Empire
House of Limburg-Stirum